Gruiten is a historical village in North Rhine-Westphalia, Germany. Since 1975 it has been part of the town Haan. The village is located on the river Düssel, between Wuppertal and Düsseldorf.

References

Villages in North Rhine-Westphalia